Joni Nyman (born 5 September 1962 in Pori) is a retired boxer (pugilist) from Finland, who won a Welterweight Bronze medal at the 1984 Summer Olympics.  He also competed at the 1988 Summer Olympics in Seoul, South Korea, where he was defeated in the quarterfinals.

Olympic results 
1984 - Los Angeles (as a welterweight)
 Round of 64: bye
 Round of 32: Defeated Georges Ngangue (Cameroon) by decision, 5-0
 Round of 16: Defeated Kieran Joyce (Ireland) by decision, 4-1
 Quarterfinal: Defeated Dwight Frazier (Jamaica) by decision, 5-0
 Semifinal: Lost to An Young-Su (South Korea) by decision, 2-3 (was awarded bronze medal)

1988 (as a welterweight)
 Defeated Manny Sobral (Canada) 4-1
 Defeated Søren Antman (Sweden) 5-0
 Defeated Dimus Chisala (Zambia) 5-0
 Lost to Kenneth Gould (United States) 0-5

Pro career
Known as "Joltin' Joni", Nyman turned pro in 1988 and had limited success.  Nyman retired in 1998 and returned in 2005 for one bout, retiring with a 14-6-1 record.

References 
 

1962 births
Living people
Sportspeople from Pori
Boxers at the 1984 Summer Olympics
Boxers at the 1988 Summer Olympics
Olympic boxers of Finland
Olympic bronze medalists for Finland
Olympic medalists in boxing
Finnish male boxers
Medalists at the 1984 Summer Olympics
Welterweight boxers